Andrew Charles Hawkins (born 16 June 1967) is a former English cricketer.  Hawkins was a left-handed batsman who bowled right-arm medium pace.  He was born in Stoke-on-Trent, Staffordshire.

Hawkins made his debut for Staffordshire in the 1987 MCCA Knockout Trophy against Berkshire.  Hawkins played Minor counties cricket for Staffordshire from 1987 to 1989, which a single 39 Minor Counties Championship match and a further MCCA Knockout Trophy match. In 1987, he made his only List A appearance against Warwickshire in the NatWest Trophy. In this match he was dismissed for 7 runs by Allan Donald, while with the ball he took the wicket of Dennis Amiss for the cost of 38 runs from 11 overs.

References

External links
Andrew Hawkins at ESPNcricinfo
Andrew Hawkins at CricketArchive

1967 births
Living people
Cricketers from Stoke-on-Trent
English cricketers
Staffordshire cricketers